Kastelli (Kastélli; also Καστέλι, Kastéli), often called Kastelli Pediadas (Greek: Καστέλλι Πεδιάδας) to differentiate it from Kissamos (also occasionally called Kastelli-Kissamos) is a village and a former municipality in the Heraklion regional unit, Crete, Greece. Since the 2011 local government reform it is part of the municipality Minoa Pediada, of which it is a municipal unit. Its population is 4,753 (2011 census).

Kastelli Airport is located in the outskirts of the village, south of the main settlement.

References

Populated places in Heraklion (regional unit)